The 1996 Mississippi State Bulldogs football team represented Mississippi State University during the 1996 NCAA Division I-A football season. The team's head coach was Jackie Sherrill. The Bulldogs played their home games in 1996 at Scott Field in Starkville, Mississippi. The season included the first win over Alabama since 1980.

Schedule

Roster

References

Mississippi State
Mississippi State Bulldogs football seasons
Mississippi State Bulldogs football